Ion Goanță (born 29 March 1963) is a Romanian former footballer who played as a midfielder.

International career
Ion Goanță played two friendly games at international level for Romania, he made his debut when he came as a substitute and replaced Dorin Mateuț in the 70th minute of a 2–0 victory against Israel.

Honours
Rapid București
Divizia B: 1989–90

Notes

References

External links

1963 births
Living people
Romanian footballers
Romania international footballers
Association football midfielders
Liga I players
Liga II players
FC Drobeta-Turnu Severin players
CSM Reșița players
FC Rapid București players
Hapoel Tzafririm Holon F.C. players
Romanian expatriate footballers
Expatriate footballers in Israel
Romanian expatriate sportspeople in Israel
People from Dolj County